The 1976 Barcelona WCT was a men's tennis tournament played on indoor carpet courts in Barcelona, Catalonia, Spain. The tournament was part of the 1976 World Championship Tennis circuit. It was the fourth and final edition of the event and was held from 2 February through 7 February 1976. Eddie Dibbs won the singles title.

Finals

Singles
 Eddie Dibbs defeated   Cliff Drysdale 6–1, 6–1

Doubles
 Bob Lutz /  Stan Smith defeated  Wojciech Fibak /  Karl Meiler 6–3, 6–3

See also
1976 Torneo Godó

References

Barcelona WCT
1976 World Championship Tennis circuit
Barcelona WCT